Bundy: An American Icon (aka Bundy: A Legacy of Evil) is a 2008 horror film depicting the criminal career of American serial killer, Ted Bundy.  It was directed by Michael Feifer and starred Corin Nemec from Parker Lewis Can't Lose.

Plot

The movie is a dramatization of the life of serial killer Ted Bundy from his traumatic childhood to his arrest and trial.

The film begins by giving its audience a peek into Ted Bundy's childhood and how distressing it was and then leading up to when he becomes an adult. It later gives us the insight into the unexplored motivations of how he becomes the infamous killer he is known for today.

Cast
Corin Nemec as Ted Bundy
Shannon Pierce Wilkins as Mrs. Bundy
Kane Hodder as Warden 
David DeLuise as Detective Jennings
Jay Pickett as Ross Davis

Critical response
Dead Central gave it a mostly negative review, citing that it portrayed nothing of interest and resembled an episode of America's Most Wanted; they also said Nemec tried his best, but looked far too old. What's On TV also praised Nemec and said the film "looks great, sounds great", but found it shallow compared to an earlier film about Bundy, The Deliberate Stranger starring Mark Harmon. Horror Review gave it 2 1/2 out of 5, praising the film's look but criticizing its editing. DVD Talk found it "meandering", neither good, nor bad enough to be kitschy fun.

References

External links

American horror films
Films about Ted Bundy
Films directed by Michael Feifer
American serial killer films